Didot may refer to:

 Didot family, family of French printers, punch-cutters and publishers that flourished mainly in the 18th century
 Didot (typeface), a group of serif typefaces
 the Didot Point (typography)
 Sylvain Didot (born 1975), French footballer and coach, played for Pontivy, Brest, Toulouse, Reims, Avranches, Briochin
 Étienne Didot (born 1983), French footballer, has played for Rennes, Toulouse, Guingamp